Adelaide of Maurienne, also called Alix or Adele (1092 – 18 November 1154) was Queen of France as the second wife of King Louis VI (1115–1137).

Family
Adelaide was the daughter of Count Humbert II of Savoy and Gisela of Burgundy. Adelaide's older brother Amadeus III succeeded their father as count of Savoy in 1103. Adelaide had the same name as her paternal great-grandmother Adelaide of Susa, ruler of the March of Turin, and her second cousin, Adelaide del Vasto, queen of Jerusalem. Through her father, Adelaide was also related to Emperor Henry V. On her mother's side, Adelaide's relatives included her uncle Pope Callixtus II, who visited Adelaide at court in France, and her first cousin King Alfonso VII of León and Castile.

Queenship
Adelaide became the second wife of King Louis VI of France, whom she married on 3 August 1115 in Paris, France. They had nine children, the second of whom became Louis VII of France. 

Adelaide was one of the most politically active of all France's medieval queens. Her name appears on 45 royal charters from the reign of Louis VI. During her tenure as queen, royal charters were dated with both her regnal year and that of the king. Among many other religious benefactions, she and Louis founded the monastery of St Peter's (Ste Pierre) at Montmartre, in the northern suburbs of Paris.

After Louis VI's death, Adelaide did not immediately retire to conventual life, as did most widowed queens of the time. Instead, she married Matthieu I of Montmorency, with whom she had one child. She remained active in the French court and religious activities.

Death
In 1153 she retired to Montmartre Abbey, which she had founded with Louis VII. She died there on 18 November 1154. She was buried in the cemetery of the Church of St. Pierre at Montmartre. The abbey was destroyed during the French Revolution, but Adelaide's tomb is still visible in the church of St Pierre.

Legend
Adelaide is one of two queens in a legend related in the seventeenth century by William Dugdale. As the story goes, Queen Adélaide of France became enamored of a young knight, William d'Albini, at a joust. However, he was already engaged to Adeliza of Louvain and refused to become her lover. The jealous Adélaide lured him into the clutches of a hungry lion, but William ripped out the beast's tongue with his bare hands and thus killed it. This story is almost without a doubt, apocryphal.

Issue
Louis and Adelaide had seven sons and two daughters:
 Philip of France (1116–1131)
 Louis VII (1120 – 18 November 1180), King of France
 Henry (1121–1175), Archbishop of Reims
 Hugues (b. c. 1122)
 Robert (c. 1123 – 11 October 1188), Count of Dreux
 Constance (c. 1124–16 August 1176), married first Eustace IV, Count of Boulogne and then Raymond V of Toulouse
 Philip (1125–1161), Bishop of Paris.
 Peter (c. 1126 – 1183), married Elizabeth, Lady of Courtenay
 a daughter, whose name is not known, who died in infancy and was interred at the Abbey of Saint-Victor, Paris

With Matthieu I of Montmorency, Adelaide had one daughter:
Adèle (or Aelis or Alix) of Montmorency

Notes

Sources

External links

Adelheid von Savoyen (in German)

French queens consort
Remarried royal consorts
House of Savoy
11th-century people from Savoy
11th-century French women
12th-century French nobility
12th-century French women
12th-century French people
1092 births
1154 deaths
Queen mothers